Asuna may refer to:

 Asuna Tanaka, (1988) japanese football player
 Asüna, an automotive marque sold in Canada 1992–1993
 Asuna (Sword Art Online), a main character from the light novel and anime series Sword Art Online
 Asuna Kagurazaka, a character in the manga and anime series Negima!
 Asuna, also known as Flannery, a character in Pokémon
 Asuna Harukaze, a character from the manga Softenni
 Asuna, a character in the television series Kishiryu Sentai Ryusoulger
 Asuna Yamase, a character in Ultraman X
 Asuna Kujo, a character in the manga series Maison Ikkoku

Japanese feminine given names